The 1994–95 season in Argentine football saw River Plate win the Apertura 1994 and San Lorenzo win the Cluasura 1995 tournaments.

Torneo Apertura ("Opening" Tournament)

Top scorer

Torneo Clausura ("Closing" Tournament)

Top Scorers

Relegation

Argentine clubs in international competitions

References

Argentina 1994-1995 by Pablo Ciullini  at rsssf.
Argentina 1990s by Osvaldo José Gorgazzi and Victor Hugo Kurhy at rsssf.
Copa CONMEBOL 1994 by Juan Pablo Andrés and Julio Bovi Diogo at rsssf.
Copa Libertadores 1995 by Juan Pablo Andrés and Frank Ballesteros at rsssf.

 

it:Campionato di calcio argentino 1994-1995
pl:I liga argentyńska w piłce nożnej (1994/1995)